The 157th Georgia General Assembly convened its first session on January9, 2023 at the Georgia State Capitol in Atlanta, and is expected to run through March29; as stipulated in the Constitution of Georgia, the General Assembly can only hold a session "for a period of no longer than 40 days in the aggregate each year".

March6 was "Crossover Day", the informal name for the date by which bills must have passed through one chamber in order to remain on track to become law.

The Assembly's members were elected in the 2022 State Senate and State House elections.

Activity
Governor Brian Kemp's floor leaders for the 2023 and 2024 sessions are senators Bo Hatchett and Mike Hodges, and representatives Matthew Gambill, Soo Hong, Lauren McDonald, and Will Wade.

In late January 2023, Democratic lawmakers Sally Harrell and Shea Roberts introduced twin bills  S.B.15 and H.B.75, both described as "long-shot legislation" by the Atlanta Journal-Constitution  that would repeal Georgia's 2019 anti-abortion law and add abortion protections to the Official Code of Georgia Annotated.

Representative John Carson sponsored H.B.54, to increase Georgia's Qualified Education Expense Credit program cap from $120million to $200million.

Representative Darlene Taylor (R-Thomasville) introduced the Okefenokee Protection Act (H.B.71), intended to help protect the Okefenokee National Wildlife Refuge  from mining projects. The bill attracted bipartisan support from Buddy DeLoach and Mary Frances Williams, among about 36 others. Taylor had filed an ultimately unsuccessful similar bill in the previous assembly.

Sports betting
Sports betting was federally banned in the US by the Professional and Amateur Sports Protection Act of 1992 until the Supreme Court struck down the law in Murphy v. National Collegiate Athletic Association (2018), allowing each state to regulate sports gambling. Governor Kemp had been opposed to legalizing betting in the past, but changed his position in 2023.

Several bills regarding sports betting were introduced during the 2023 session.

State Senate

Special elections
Governor Brian Kemp chose state senator Dean Burke to be chief medical officer of the Georgia Department of Community Health in December 2022. Burke resigned on December 31, and an election to fill the Senate District 11 seat was scheduled for January31, 2023. Three candidates qualified for the election: John H. Monds (L), Sam Watson (R), and Mary Weaver-Anderson (D). Watson won the election easily.

Membership
, the Georgia State Senate is composed of 56 members:

House of Representatives

Special elections
After former speaker David Ralston's resignation and death, a special election was held on January3, 2023 to fill the seat in House District 7. Since no candidate reached a vote threshold of 50%, a runoff between Sheree Ralston, David Ralston's widow, and Johnny Chastain  both members of the Fannin County Development Authority  was held on January31, 2023; in an upset, Chastain defeated Ralston.

House District 119's previous representative Terry England did not seek reelection in 2022. After winning unopposed in the general election, former Barrow County Chamber of Commerce chair Danny Rampey was arrested in December 2022 and charged with stealing prescription medications. Bowing to pressure from the state Republican party, Rampey announced he would not take office, and Governor Kemp scheduled a special election to be held on January31, 2023. No candidate won a majority of the vote, so a runoff was held on February 28 between Republicans Holt Persinger and Charlie Chase; Persinger won the runoff.

State representative Sam Watson resigned from his seat in House District 172 in order to run for the newly-open spot in State Senate District 11. A special election was held on January31, 2023; the only candidate to qualify for the ballot was Colquitt County administrator Charles "Chas" Cannon.

Democratic member Mike Glanton resigned on January24, 2023 due to health reasons; a special election will be held on March21, 2023 to fill the seat.

Democratic representative Tish Naghise died on March8, 2023; she had represented the 68th District.

Membership
, the membership of the House is as follows:

References and notes

Georgia (U.S. state) legislative sessions
2023 in Georgia (U.S. state)
Georgia